Entodon concinnus is a species of moss belonging to the family Entodontaceae.

It has cosmopolitan distribution.

References

Hypnales